Mandeep Kaur (born 19 April 1988 in Jagadhri) is an Indian athlete who mainly competes in the 400 meters. She competed at the 2008 Olympic Games, but failed to pass the first round. Mandeep Kaur won gold medals in the women's  events at the 2010 Commonwealth Games and the 2010 and 2014 Asian Games.

On 29 June 2011, Reuters reported that she had tested positive for the anabolic steroids methandienone and stanozolol during off-season tests, following the same day announcement of the Athletics Federation of India. She blamed the results on tainted food supplements, and denied taking any banned substance knowingly. After a total of 6 Indian female 400m runners tested positive, including Mandeep's teammates at the Commonwealth Games, Ashwini Akkunji and Sini Jose, the team coach, Ukrainian Yuri Ogrodnik, was fired by India's Sport's Minister Ajay Maken.

References

External links
 

1988 births
Living people
Indian female sprinters
21st-century Indian women
21st-century Indian people
Olympic athletes of India
Athletes (track and field) at the 2008 Summer Olympics
Commonwealth Games gold medallists for India
Athletes (track and field) at the 2010 Commonwealth Games
Asian Games medalists in athletics (track and field)
Asian Games gold medalists for India
Athletes (track and field) at the 2010 Asian Games
Athletes (track and field) at the 2014 Asian Games
Doping cases in athletics
Indian sportspeople in doping cases
Punjabi people
People from Yamunanagar district
Sportswomen from Haryana
Commonwealth Games medallists in athletics
Medalists at the 2010 Asian Games
Medalists at the 2014 Asian Games
Athletes from Haryana
Medallists at the 2010 Commonwealth Games